Roger Garlock Barker (1903 – 1990) was a social scientist, a founder of environmental psychology and a leading figure in the field for decades, perhaps best known for his development of the concept of behavior settings and staffing theory. He was also a central figure in the development of ecological psychology and rehabilitation psychology.

Barker earned his PhD from Stanford University where his advisor was Walter Richard Miles. In the 1940s, Barker and his associate, Herbert Wright from the University of Kansas in Lawrence, set up the Midwest Psychological Field Station in the nearby town of Oskaloosa, Kansas, a town of fewer than 2,000 people. Barker's team gathered empirical data in Oskaloosa from 1947 to 1972, consistently disguising the town as "Midwest, Kansas" for publications like One Boy's Day (1952) and Midwest and Its Children (1955). Based on this data, Barker first developed the concept of the behavior setting to help explain the interplay between the individual and the immediate environment.

Possibly one of the most valuable developments of his work was the examination of the way in which the number and variety of behavior settings remains remarkably constant even as institutions increase in size. This was explored in his seminal work with Paul Gump, Big School Small School (Stanford: Stanford University Press, 1964). They showed that large schools had a similar number of behavior settings to small schools. A consequence of this was that students could take many different roles in small schools (e.g. be in the school band and the school football team), while in larger schools there was a greater tendency to be selective.

His concept of behavior settings was developed and used by Val Curtis since it allows prediction of individual behaviour from the setting in which people find themselves.

Barker died at his home in Oskaloosa in September 1990. He was survived by his wife, Louise Shedd Barker, with whom he collaborated on much of his research.

Barker is the subject of a 2014 biography — The Outsider: The Life and Times of Roger Barker — by the award-winning American journalist Ariel Sabar.

References

External links
This American Life story on Barker's Oskaloosa study

1903 births
1990 deaths
20th-century American psychologists
Environmental psychologists
Systems psychologists
People from Madison County, Iowa
People from Oskaloosa, Kansas
American psychologists